John Bathe may refer to:

John Bathe (died 1409), MP for Dorset 1397 and 1402
John Bathe (Jesuit) (1610–1649), Irish Jesuit
John Bathe (politician) (died c.1559), Solicitor-General for Ireland
John Bathe (died 1586) (1536–1586), Irish lawyer and statesman
John Bathe (mayor), Lord Mayor of Dublin, 1350–51

See also
John Bath, rugby league footballer of the 1960s